Tomás Andrés Díaz Navarrete (born 8 January 1992) is a Chilean former footballer who played as a defender for clubs in Europe, Uruguay and Chile.

Career
As a member of the Universidad Católica youth ranks, where he coincided with Santiago Dittborn, Díaz won the national titles at under-16, under-17 and under-19 levels. After rejecting a professional contract with them, he emigrated to Europa and joined Italian side Triestina in 2010. 

In 2011, he switched to Belgium and joined Union Saint-Gilloise, being loaned to Hungarian side Honvéd in 2012. In January 2012, he also had a trial with Manchester City.

On second half 2012, he returned to South America and joined Uruguayan Primera División club CA Fénix. 

In 2013, he returned to his homeland and played for Unión San Felipe until the end of the season.

Personal life
Díaz holds Italian citizenship since his grandmother is an Italian who was born in Genoa and came to Chile after the World War II.

Following his retirement, he attended Andrés Bello University and got a degree in business administration.

References

External links
 
 
 
 Tomás Díaz at FootballTransfers.com 
 

1992 births
Living people
Chilean people of Italian descent
Footballers from Santiago
Chilean footballers
Chilean expatriate footballers
U.S. Triestina Calcio 1918 players
Royale Union Saint-Gilloise players
Budapest Honvéd FC players
Centro Atlético Fénix players
Unión San Felipe footballers
Serie B players
Uruguayan Primera División players
Primera B de Chile players
Chilean expatriate sportspeople in Italy
Chilean expatriate sportspeople in Belgium
Chilean expatriate sportspeople in Hungary
Chilean expatriate sportspeople in Uruguay
Expatriate footballers in Italy
Expatriate footballers in Belgium
Expatriate footballers in Hungary
Expatriate footballers in Uruguay
Association football defenders
People with acquired Italian citizenship